is a former Japanese football player. His younger brother Yasuo Manaka is also a former footballer.

Playing career
Manaka was born in Bando on May 22, 1969. After graduating from University of Tsukuba, he joined JEF United Ichihara in 1992. He played mane matches as center back from 1994. He moved to Japan Football League club Brummell Sendai in 1997. However he could hardly play in the match and moved to Omiya Ardija in 1998. In 1999, he moved to new club Yokohama FC in Japan Football League. The club won the champions in 1999 and 2000 and was promoted to J2 League. In July 2004, his younger brother Yasuo Manaka also came the club. He retired with Yasuo end of 2004 season.

Club statistics

References

External links

1969 births
Living people
University of Tsukuba alumni
Association football people from Ibaraki Prefecture
Japanese footballers
J1 League players
J2 League players
Japan Football League (1992–1998) players
Japan Football League players
JEF United Chiba players
Vegalta Sendai players
Omiya Ardija players
Yokohama FC players
Association football defenders